Hummelinck's vesper mouse (Calomys hummelincki) is a species of rodent in the family Cricetidae.
It is found in Aruba, Brazil, Colombia, the Netherlands Antilles, and Venezuela.

References

Musser, G. G. and M. D. Carleton. 2005. Superfamily Muroidea. pp. 894–1531 in Mammal Species of the World a Taxonomic and Geographic Reference. D. E. Wilson and D. M. Reeder eds. Johns Hopkins University Press, Baltimore.

Calomys
Mammals of Colombia
Mammals described in 1960
Taxonomy articles created by Polbot